Delmo Community Center, also known as South Wardell Utility Building, is a historic community centre located at Homestown, Pemiscot County, Missouri. It was designed and constructed by the Farm Security Administration in 1940 as a utility building for the entire community.  It is a long one-story, rectangular, frame building on a concrete foundation.  It measures approximately 56 feet by 26 feet and is sheathed in clapboard siding.

It was listed on the National Register of Historic Places in 2009.

References

New Deal in Missouri
Government buildings on the National Register of Historic Places in Missouri
Government buildings completed in 1940
Buildings and structures in Pemiscot County, Missouri
National Register of Historic Places in Pemiscot County, Missouri